This is the complete list of Asian Games medalists in softball from 1990 to 2018.

Women

References

Softball at the Asian Games

External links
 Medallists from previous Asian Games – Softball

Softball
medalists